Engels Air Force Base (formally Engels-2) is a strategic bomber military airbase in Russia located  east of Saratov. Engels is a major bomber operations base, and is Russia's sole operating location for the Tupolev Tu-160 (NATO: Blackjack) strategic bomber. The base has a  runway and about 10 large revetments. It is named after the nearby city of Engels, which is named after the Communist philosopher, Friedrich Engels.

The base is home to the 121st Guards Heavy Bomber Aviation Regiment with the Tu-160M and 184th Heavy Bomber Aviation Regiment with the Tupolev Tu-95MS (NATO: Bear-H) of the 22nd Guards Heavy Bomber Aviation Division.

Aircraft from the 121st and 184th attacked Ukraine during the 2022 Russian invasion of Ukraine.

History
In 1930, the construction of a military piloting school began 1.5 km from the town of Engels, in a vacant lot. The 14th School of Pilots was activated at Engels in December 1930. Around 10,000 people worked on the site. In February 1932, the first airplane, a Polikarpov U-2 used the site. The school was renamed the Engels School of Pilots. 

By 1936, the Engels military aviation school was one of the best flight schools in the country. Students flew Polikarpov U-2, Polikarpov R-5 and CSS aircraft. Prior to the Second World War the school trained several thousand pilots. Many of them fought in the Spanish Civil War, participated in the Battles of Khalkhin Gol and the Soviet-Finnish War (1939–1940). For participation in the fighting, seven pupils were named Heroes of the Soviet Union.

At the beginning of the Second World War the school had in service Polikarpov U-2, ANT-40, Pe-2, and other aircraft. During the war years the Engels Flying School sent to the front 14 regiments. Among them were three women's regiments (including the Night Witches), in which served Major Marina Raskova. 190 pupils of the school were awarded the title of Hero of the Soviet Union for combat exploits.

In the early 1950s, the construction of the new "Engels-2" airport with a concrete runway with a length of 3 km and a width of 100m began. Therefore, by September 1954 the Engels school was moved to the city of Tambov. In December 1954, the 201st Heavy Bomber Aviation Division was established, comprising the 79th, 1096th and 1230th Heavy Bomber Aviation Regiments (TBAPs). The personnel of the regiments was assembled by choosing the best specialists of the Long Range Aviation, graduates of military schools and academies. In 1954, the Engels area was closed off from Western ground observation.

The first Myasishchev M-4 bombers arrived in Engels in February 1955. In May 1957, the first modernised 3M bomber arrived. In 1957, the 79th Heavy Bomber Aviation Regiment was transferred to Ukrainka and was transferred to the 73rd Heavy Bomber Aviation Division. Gradually the M-4 and 3M bombers were converted into aerial refuelling tankers. Air refueling significantly increased the range of the bombers, which expanded their capacity. Around 1960, the 1230th Heavy Bomber Aviation Regiment was renamed the 1230th Aviation Regiment Air Refueling. 

The 3M bombers were part of Long Range Aviation until 1985, and then were destroyed in accordance with the agreement on the reduction of offensive weapons. The 3MS-II and 3MN-II, converted into tankers, were in service for much longer – up to the end of 1993 and before being replaced by the more advanced Il-78.

The base was to have received the first production Tu-160 in 1987, but it went to Priluki, whose units had Tupolev Tu-22M experience. The first three Tu-160s not at Pryluky were incorporated into the 1096th Heavy Bomber Aviation Regiment in 1992. By 1994 Engels had five Tu-160 bombers in operation. That same year the 1096th Heavy Bomber Aviation Regiment was redesignated the 121st Heavy Bomber Aviation Regiment, adopting its colours and traditions. In 1998 the START I treaty exchange of information showed it had 20 operational Tupolev Tu-95 bombers and six Tu-160 bombers, all with cruise missile capability.

From 1999 to 2001 the base received eight Tu-160s from Ukraine paid for by gas price reductions. The last two arrived in February 2001. The 184th Guards Heavy Bomber Aviation Regiment was reformed at the base in September 2000, drawing on Tu-95MS aircraft transferred from Mozdok. By 2007 the base had 14 Tu-160s, 20 Tu-95s and an unknown number of Tu-22Ms.

Construction of a new runway parallel to the existing one was completed in 2015 in conjunction with a supporting network of taxiways, communications, electrical and meteorological systems. The new runway will be able to handle all Russian Air Force aircraft.

2022 Russian invasion of Ukraine
On 5 December 2022, during the 2022 Russian invasion of Ukraine, an explosion caused by a Ukrainian drone attack reportedly damaged two Tu-95s. According to Russian Ministry of Defence, Ukraine attempted to strike Russia's long-range aviation bombers stationed at the base with Soviet-made jet drones. Russia claims the drones were intercepted by air defence systems at low altitude. Satellite images revealed after the attack show at least one Tu-95MS bomber being damaged. The Dyagilevo Air Base was also raided on the same night.

On 26 December 2022, at midnight, explosions were again reported at the air base. Air sirens were reported being heard at the base and surrounding areas. The local governor Roman Busargin reported no damage to "civilian infrastructure". At least two explosions were heard. These explosions have been reported by both the Ukrainian and Russian media. Three people from the “technical staff” have reportedly been killed. According to Russian television, "A Ukrainian unmanned aerial vehicle was shot down at low altitude while approaching the Engels military airfield in the Saratov region," Ukrainian and Russian social media accounts report a number of bombers have been destroyed. However Reuters could not confirm these claims.

On 29 December, the Russian regional governor, Roman Busargin, claimed that a Ukrainian drone was shot near the airbase with only slight damage to residential housing and no injuries. Reports on social confirm air raid sirens and explosions.

Aircraft

, the base had:
14 Tu-160s (121st Guards Heavy Bomber Aviation Regiment)
20 Tu-95s (184th Heavy Bomber Aviation Regiment)
Unknown number of Tu-22M-3s (6950th Aviation Base)
1 Ilyushin Il-62

The 22nd Guards Heavy Bomber Aviation Division of the 37th Air Army controlled operations at the base up until the Air Force reorganisation of 2009–10. In 2015/16, the division was reformed within the Russian Aerospace Force's Long-Range Aviation branch and based at Engels.

Museum 
At the Engels airbase is the Long-Range Aviation Museum. This unique open-air museum was opened in September 2000. It was visited by more than 5,000 people in a year.

The museum displays:
 airplanes: Ilyushin Il-62, Myasishchev M-4-3MS-2, Antonov An-2, Antonov An-12, Antonov An-24, Tupolev Tu-95, Tupolev Tu-22, Tupolev Tu-134, Aero L-29 Delfín, Aero L-39 Albatros, Tupolev Tu-22M3;
 cruise missiles: Kh-55, Kh-22НА, Kh-20М, KSR-2UD;
 bombs: FAB-9000 M, FAB-5000 M, FAB-3000 M, FAB-1500 M, FAB-500 M, FAB-250 M, FAB-250 TS, SAB-250 T, OFAB-250,  NOSAB-100TK, DOSAB-100 TC;
 historically valuable items: attributes of the Long-Range Aviation of Russia, commemorative photographs, fragments of rare aircraft.

The museum contains books for reviews, the records of which were left by the presidents Boris Yeltsin and Vladimir Putin. A room was built where models of airplanes are presented, stands illustrating the history of long-range aviation, aircraft dashboards, and aircraft armament.

The director of the museum is reserve major Sergei Alexandrovich Voronov.

References

Bibliography

External links / further reading 

 GlobalSecurity.org, Engel's, accessed December 2012.
 "Report on Bomber Elimination at Engels AFB", FBIS Daily Report FBIS-SOV-95-136, 5 July 1995

Soviet Long Range Aviation bases
Soviet Air Defence Force bases
Russian Air Force bases
Buildings and structures in Saratov Oblast